= Generational imbalance =

Generational imbalance is the economic and political tension which characterizes a state which has a reduced birth rate and increased health resulting in an increasing aging population compared to its younger working population; cost and generosity of welfare systems also plays a role.

== External links and further reading ==
- Laurence J. Kotlikoff and Scott Burns The Coming Generational Storm": What You Need to Know about America's Economic Future", The MIT Press; New Ed edition (January 18, 2005), trade paperback, 302 pages, ISBN 0262612089, ISBN 978-0262612081
